Mike Sanders may refer to:

 Mike Sanders (basketball) (born 1960), American basketball player
 Mike Sanders (Missouri politician) (born 1967), Jackson County politician
Mike Sanders (wrestler) (born 1969), American stand-up comedian and wrestler
 Michael Sinclair Sanders (born 1939), British amateur archaeologist
 Mike Sanders (Oklahoma politician)